Winogradskyella maritima is a Gram-negative, aerobic, rod-shaped and motile bacterium from the genus of Winogradskyella which has been isolated from seawater from the Yellow Sea.

References

Flavobacteria
Bacteria described in 2017